Sean Andrew Marks (born 23 August 1975) is a New Zealand-American basketball executive and former player and coach who is the general manager and alternate owner of the Brooklyn Nets of the National Basketball Association (NBA). He was the first New Zealand-born player to play in the NBA. Marks won two championships with the San Antonio Spurs: one as a player in 2005 and another as an assistant coach in 2014.

Basketball career

After attending Rangitoto College in Auckland, Marks moved to the United States in 1992 to play for the University of California, Berkeley where he majored in political science, graduating with a BA degree in 1998. He was drafted 44th overall in the 1998 NBA Draft by the New York Knicks, and was traded on draft night, alongside Charles Oakley, to the Toronto Raptors for Marcus Camby. Marks would later play for the Miami Heat and San Antonio Spurs.

In 2000–01, Marks started the season with Śląsk Wrocław of Poland, and in December 2000 had an unsuccessful ten-day contract (0 games) with the Seattle SuperSonics, returning to his Polish team until the season ended. In 2003–04, while with the Spurs, he did not play a single second due to patella tendonitis.

In the next season, while playing for the Spurs Marks averaged 10 minutes per game and produced an average of 3 points and 2 rebounds. That year the Spurs won the NBA championship by defeating the Detroit Pistons in seven games. Marks did not receive any playing time for the Spurs during the 2005 playoffs.

Marks signed with the Phoenix Suns on 27 July 2006, to a one-year contract, re-signing with the Arizona outfit on 24 July 2007.
On 16 April 2008, during a win over the Portland Trail Blazers in the Suns last regular-season game, Marks scored a double-double with 16 points and 13 rebounds, along with 1 steal and 1 block.

Marks later signed with the New Orleans Hornets on 28 August 2008. On 21 October 2010, Marks was waived by the Washington Wizards after he had failed to suit up for a pre-season game because of a hamstring injury. He was signed by Portland in November after the retirement of Fabricio Oberto.

On 24 February 2011, Marks was traded along with Joel Przybilla, Dante Cunningham and two future first-round draft picks to the Charlotte Bobcats for Gerald Wallace. The Bobcats waived Marks on March 3, 2011.

Internationally, Marks represented New Zealand. He competed in the 2000 and 2004 Olympic Games, and was part of their fourth-place finish at the 2002 FIBA World Championship held in Indianapolis, US.

Coaching and executive career

Marks retired in 2011. In 2012, he was named basketball operations assistant for the San Antonio Spurs and general manager for the Austin Toros. He became an assistant coach with the Spurs in 2013. The Spurs went on to win the 2014 NBA Finals after defeating the Miami Heat in five games. It was Marks second championship and first as an assistant coach. At the start of the following season he returned to the front office, being named assistant general manager.

On 18 February 2016, it was announced that the Brooklyn Nets named Marks as the new general manager for the team, and penned a 4-year contract. Marks told then-owner Mikhail Prokhorov that his vision for rebuilding a team that had collapsed to only 21 wins involved a process that would take several years to execute, and made clear that he was not interested in a repeat of Prokhorov's previous "win now" approach. Earlier, Prokhorov had acknowledged his previous free-spending strategy was not the best way in the long run to build a champion. During the third year of Marks' contract, the Nets appeared in the 2019 NBA Playoffs, making it their first appearance since 2015.

On 19 May 2017, Marks was inducted into the Basketball New Zealand Hall of Fame.

On 21 April 2019, Marks was suspended for Game 5 of the Nets' contest against the Philadelphia 76ers, due to entering the referees’ locker room after the Nets' Game 4 loss. He was subsequently fined $25,000.

NBA career statistics

Regular season

|-
| align="left" | 
| style="text-align:left;"|Toronto
| 8 || 0 || 3.5 || .625 || .000 || .500 || .1 || .0 || .1 || .0 || 1.4
|-
| style="text-align:left;"|
| style="text-align:left;"| Toronto
| 5 || 0 || 2.4 || .333 || .000 || 1.000 || .4 || .0 || .2 || .2 || 1.6
|-
| style="text-align:left;"|
| style="text-align:left;"| Miami
| 21 || 6 || 15.2 || .432 || .000 || .588 || 3.6 || .4 || .2 || .5 || 4.6
|-
| style="text-align:left;"|
| style="text-align:left;"| Miami
| 23 || 0 || 9.7 || .373 || .000 || .667 || 1.5 || .1 || .2 || .3 || 2.3
|-
| style="text-align:left;background:#afe6ba;" | †
| style="text-align:left;"| San Antonio
| 23 || 0 || 10.6 || .338 || .000 || .786 || 2.4 || .3 || .1 || .5 || 3.3
|-
| style="text-align:left;"|
| style="text-align:left;"| San Antonio
| 25 || 0 || 7.2 || .521 || .000 || .583 || 1.7 || .3 || .2 || .3 || 3.2
|-
| style="text-align:left;"|
| style="text-align:left;"| Phoenix
| 3 || 0 || 5.7 || .333 || .000 || 1.000 || 1.0 || .0 || .0 || .3 || 2.0
|-
| style="text-align:left;"|
| style="text-align:left;"| Phoenix
| 19 || 0 || 6.8 || .535 || .250 || .632 || 1.9 || .2 || .2 || .5 || 3.1
|-
| style="text-align:left;"|
| style="text-align:left;"|New Orleans
| 60 || 5 || 14.0 || .485 || .200 || .682 || 3.1 || .2 || .1 || .6 || 3.2
|-
| style="text-align:left;"|
| style="text-align:left;"|New Orleans
| 14 || 0 || 5.4 || .500 || .000 || .400 || 1.6 || .1 || .0 || .2 || .7
|-
| align="left" | 
| style="text-align:left;"|Portland
| 29 || 0 || 7.2 || .432 || 1.000 || .625 || 1.4 || .1 || .1 || .2 || 1.6
|- class="sortbottom"
| style="text-align:center;" colspan="2"| Career
| 230 || 11 || 9.9 || .448 || .200 || .665 || 2.2 || .2 || .1 || .4 || 2.8

Playoffs

|-
| align="left" | 2008
| align="left" | Phoenix
| 1 || 0 || 3.0 || .000 || .000 || .000 || .0 || .0 || .0 || .0 || .0
|-
| align="left" | 2009
| align="left" | New Orleans
| 5 || 0 || 16.0 || .462 || .000 || .800 || 4.0 || .0 || .6 || .4 || 3.2
|- class="sortbottom"
| style="text-align:center;" colspan="2"| Career
| 6 || 0 || 13.8 || .462 || .000 || .800 || 3.3 || .0 || .5 || .3 || 2.7

Personal life
Marks and his wife Jennifer have four sons. The family resides in Greenwich, Connecticut. 

Marks became an American citizen in 2007.

See also 
List of National Basketball Association team presidents

References

External links

New Zealand Pioneer – Sean Marks

1975 births
Living people
2002 FIBA World Championship players
Basketball players at the 2000 Summer Olympics
Basketball players at the 2004 Summer Olympics
Basketball players from Auckland
Brooklyn Nets executives
California Golden Bears men's basketball players
Centers (basketball)
Miami Heat players
National Basketball Association players from New Zealand
New Orleans Hornets players
New York Knicks draft picks
New Zealand basketball coaches
New Zealand expatriate basketball people in Canada
New Zealand expatriate basketball people in Poland
New Zealand expatriate basketball people in the United States
New Zealand men's basketball players
New Zealand emigrants to the United States
People with acquired American citizenship
Olympic basketball players of New Zealand
People educated at Rangitoto College
People from Prospect Heights, Brooklyn
Phoenix Suns players
Portland Trail Blazers players
Power forwards (basketball)
San Antonio Spurs assistant coaches
San Antonio Spurs executives
San Antonio Spurs players
Śląsk Wrocław basketball players
Toronto Raptors players